Henry Hills Moore (born 4 October 2002) is a Hong Kong professional footballer of Australian descent who currently plays as a midfielder for NSW League One club Central Coast United.

Club career

Happy Valley 
Moore was promoted to the Happy Valley's first team for the 2020–21 season. Moore then scored his first goal on his professional debut against R&F in a 5-2 defeat. He scored again against Resources Capital to help Happy Valley win 2–0 in the Sapling Cup. 

Following the club's self-relegation due to financial reasons, Moore left the club.

Alicante City 
On 1 January 2022, it was announced that Moore had moved to Alicante City's academy in Spain to further his development.

HKFC 
Moore was announced as part of the HKFC squad for the 2022-23 Hong Kong Premier League season after he suffered an injury.

Moore scored and assisted in the 4-2 comeback victory over Tai Po. He would give another assist in a 5-1 thrashing of Sham Shui Po in the Sapling Cup to Adam Bailey to finish off the game.

Central Coast United 
In February 2023, Moore joined Central Coast United.

Career statistics

Club

Notes

Personal life 
Henry's family currently resides in Central Coast, Australia.

References

External links

Living people
2002 births
Hong Kong footballers
Hong Kong expatriate footballers
Australian soccer players
Association football midfielders
Hong Kong Premier League players
Happy Valley AA players
Hong Kong FC players
Expatriate footballers in Spain
Australian people of Hong Kong descent
Hong Kong people of Australian descent